The Donets Ridge is a highland that is the highest northeastern part of the Donets upland. The ridge is located within the Donetsk and Luhansk Oblasts and is partially in the Rostov Oblast (Russia). The highest point on the ridge is a hill — Mohyla Mechetna, .

Another hill, Savur-Mohyla, was a notable site in the War in Donbass.

Name
The name derives from the river Seversky (Siversky) Donets.

References

External links
 Donets Ridge at the Great Soviet Encyclopedia

Plateaus of Ukraine
Donbas
Geography of Donetsk Oblast
Geography of Luhansk Oblast
Landforms of Rostov Oblast
Plateaus of Russia